Solbiate  is a comune (municipality) in the Province of Como in the Italian region Lombardy, located about  northwest of Milan and about  southwest of Como.

Solbiate borders the following municipalities: Albiolo, Beregazzo con Figliaro, Binago, Cagno, Malnate, Olgiate Comasco.

Demographic evolution

References

Cities and towns in Lombardy